This list of fossil arthropods described in 2014 is a list of new taxa of trilobites, fossil insects, crustaceans, arachnids and other fossil arthropods of every kind that have been described during the year 2014. The list only includes taxa at the level of genus or species.

Arachnids

Newly named taxa

Newly named crustaceans

Insects

Trilobites

Other arthropods

References

Arthropod paleontology
Lists of arthropods
2014 in paleontology
Articles containing video clips